Algeria first competed at the Olympic Games in 1964, and has participated in every Summer Olympic Games since then, except for the boycotted 1976 Summer Olympics.  Algeria has also sent athletes to the Winter Olympic Games on three occasions.
The National Olympic Committee for Algeria is the Comité Olympique Algérien (Algerian Olympic Committee), founded in 1963.

History

Before independence during the French Algeria period, the Algerian athletes were participating with France, among the most famous, the gold medalists Boughera El Ouafi in 1928, Alain Mimoun in 1956 and many others.

After independence in 1962, Algeria participated in the Olympic Games for the first time at the 1964 Summer Olympics with gymnast Mohamed Lazhari. 
Algeria withdrew from the 1976 Summer Olympics due to the refusal of the IOC to ban countries who had competed in South Africa amidst its apartheid policies. Almost every nation in Africa participated in the boycott. South Africa itself had been banned from the Olympics since 1964.

In the 1980 Summer Olympics Algeria participated for the first time in a team sport, competing in both football and handball. Their first medal came at the 1984 Summer Olympics, where Mustapha Moussa won bronze in boxing.

Medal tables

Medals by Summer Games

Medals by Winter Games

Medals by sport

Athletes with most medals 
Only two Algerian athlete have won two medals in the history of the Olympic Games: middle-distance runner Taoufik Makhloufi and boxer Hocine Soltani.  

Notes: in Khaki the athletes still in activity.

Gold medalist
In this table (sorted by individual totals gold medals), the men who have won gold individual medals at the Olympics (but also at the World Championships).

Notes: in Khaki the athletes still in activity.

List of medalists

Flagbearers

Algeria at the Olympic Games Football Tournament

See also
 Algeria national athletics team
 List of participating nations at the Summer Olympic Games
 List of participating nations at the Winter Olympic Games
 :Category:Olympic competitors for Algeria
 Algeria at the Paralympics
 Algeria at the African Games
 Algeria at the Mediterranean Games
 Algeria at the Pan Arab Games
 Algeria at the Islamic Solidarity Games

References

External links